Al-Ṭuwāl the Grammarian, surnamed Abū ‘Abd Allāh, or Muḥammad ibn Aḥmad ibn ‘Abd Allāh.  Al-Ṭuwal the Grammarian was a ninth-century philologist of the School of Kūfah.

Life
He was a disciple of al-Kisā’ī and attended the lectures of al-Aṣma’ī.   He moved to Baghdād where Abū 'Umar al-Durī al-Muqrī was his disciple ('hearer').  Abū al-Abbās Tha’lab said he was a skillful analyst of Arabic grammar.  No books of his are known. He died in 857-858 (243 AH).

See also

List of Arab scientists and scholars
Encyclopædia Britannica Online

Notes

References

Bibliography

857 deaths
9th-century linguists
9th-century philologists
9th-century scholars
Scholars from the Abbasid Caliphate
Arabic language
Grammarians of Arabic
Grammarians of Kufa
Philologists of Arabic